Willimon is a surname. Notable people with the surname include:

Beau Willimon (born 1977), American playwright and screenwriter
William Henry Willimon (born 1946), American theologian